GDH/6PGL endoplasmic bifunctional protein is a protein that in humans is encoded by the H6PD gene.

Function 

There are two forms of glucose-6-phosphate dehydrogenase. G form is X-linked and H form, encoded by this gene, is autosomally linked. This H form shows activity with other hexose-6-phosphates, especially galactose-6-phosphate, whereas the G form is specific for glucose-6-phosphate. Both forms are present in most tissues, but H form is not found in red cells.

References

Further reading